The 2022–23 Northeast Conference women's basketball season will begin with practices in October 2023, followed by the start of the 2022–23 NCAA Division I women's basketball season in November. Conference play will start in January and end in March 2023.

The NEC tournament will be held in March with the higher-seeded team hosting each game.

Changes from last season
Stonehill College joined the Northeast Conference from Division II Northeast-10 Conference. They are not eligible for the NEC tournament until the 2026–27 season when their four-year reclassification period ends.

Bryant left the conference and joined the America East Conference.

Mount St. Mary's left the conference and joined the Metro Atlantic Athletic Conference (MAAC).

Head coaches 

Notes: 
 All records, appearances, titles, etc. are from time with current school only. 
 Year at school includes 2022–23 season.
 Overall and NEC/NCAA records are from time at current school and are before the beginning of the 2022–23 season. 
 Previous jobs are head coaching jobs unless otherwise noted.

Preseason

Preseason coaches poll
Sources:

() first place votes

Preseason All-NEC team
Sources:

NEC regular season

Records against other conferences
2022–23 records against non-conference foes as of (November 28, 2022):

Regular Season

Post Season

Record against ranked non-conference opponents
This is a list of games against ranked opponents only (rankings from the AP Poll):

Team rankings are reflective of AP poll when the game was played, not current or final ranking

† denotes game was played on neutral site

Conference matrix
This table summarizes the head-to-head results between teams in conference play.

Players of the Week 
Throughout the conference regular season, the Northeast Conference offices named two (Player and Freshman) players of the week each Monday.

All-NEC honors and awards
At the conclusion of the regular season, the conference selects outstanding performers based on a poll of league coaches, below are the results.

Postseason

NEC tournament

NCAA tournament

See also
2022–23 Northeast Conference men's basketball season

References

External links
NEC website